Chrome is the fourth studio album by American country music singer Trace Adkins. It was released on October 9, 2001, on Capitol Records Nashville. The album produced three singles for Adkins on the Billboard Hot Country Songs charts: "I'm Tryin'" at No. 6, "Help Me Understand" at No. 17, and the title track at No. 10. It has also been certified gold by the RIAA. The album was produced by Trey Bruce (tracks 3, 5–8, 10, 11) and Dann Huff (tracks 1, 2, 4, 9, 12).

The album's title track was later covered by Jeffrey Steele on his 2003 album Gold, Platinum, Chrome, and Steele.

Track listing

Personnel
Adapted from Chrome liner notes.

 Tim Akers – keyboards (2, 12)
 Mike Brignardello – bass guitar (1, 2, 4, 9, 12)
 Trey Bruce – programming (3, 7, 8, 10, 11), percussion (5)
 Pat Buchanan – electric guitar (3, 5, 6, 7, 8, 10, 11)
 Tim Coats – Jew's harp (10)
 J. T. Corenflos – electric guitar (3, 6, 7, 8, 10)
 Eric Darken – percussion (2, 4, 9)
 Thom Flora – background vocals (5, 11)
 Larry Franklin – fiddle (1, 2)
 Paul Franklin – steel guitar (1, 2, 4, 9, 12)
 Tony Harrell – piano (3, 5, 6, 7, 8, 11), Hammond B-3 organ (8), accordion (10)
 Aubrey Haynie – fiddle (12)
 Wes Hightower – background vocals (3, 6, 7, 8, 10)
 Steve Hinson – steel guitar (3, 5, 6, 7, 8, 10, 11)
 John Hobbs – piano (1), keyboards (2)
 Dann Huff – electric guitar (1, 2, 4, 9, 12)
 B. James Lowry – acoustic guitar (4, 9, 12)
 Brent Mason – electric guitar (1, 2, 4, 9)
 Chris McHugh – drums (1, 2)
 Jerry McPherson – electric guitar (12)
 Greg Morrow – drums (3, 5, 6, 7, 8, 10, 11)
 Steve Nathan – keyboards (4, 9)
 Alison Prestwood – bass guitar (3, 5, 6, 7, 8, 10, 11)
 Chris Rodriguez – background vocals (8, 10)
 Matt Rollings – keyboards (12)
 Brian Siewert – synthesizer (3, 5, 6, 7, 8, 10, 11)
 Michael Spriggs – acoustic guitar (3, 5, 6, 7, 8, 10, 11)
 Russell Terrell – background vocals (1, 2, 4, 5, 9, 11, 12)
 Biff Watson – acoustic guitar (1, 2)
 Lonnie Wilson – drums (4, 9, 12)
 Curtis Wright – background vocals (3, 6, 7)
 Jonathan Yudkin – violin (3, 4, 5, 6, 7, 11), mandolin (3), cello (4), mandocello (4), strings (8), wah-wah fiddle (9), fiddle (10)

Technical
Tracks 1, 2, 4, 9, 12
 Jeff Balding – recording, mixing
 Mark Hagen – recording
 Dann Huff – producer
 Shawn Simpson – digital editing

Tracks 3, 5–8, 10, 11
 Trey Bruce – producer
 David Buchanan – recording
 Greg Droman – mixing (tracks 5 and 11 only)
 Jason Garner – engineering
 John Kunz – engineering
 Mike Shipley – mixing (except 5 and 11)
 Luke Wooten – engineering

All tracks mastered by Glenn Meadows

Chart performance

Weekly charts

Year-end charts

Singles

Certifications

References

2001 albums
Trace Adkins albums
Capitol Records albums